The United States competed at the 1924 Winter Olympics in Chamonix, France.

Medalists 

The following U.S. competitors won medals at the games. In the by discipline sections below, medalists' names are bolded.

Cross-country skiing

Figure skating

Individual

Mixed

Ice hockey

Summary

Roster

First round
The top two teams (highlighted) advanced to the medal round.

Medal round
Results from the group round (Canada-Sweden and United States-Great Britain) carried forward to the medal round.

Nordic combined 

The cross-country skiing part of this event was combined with the 18 km race of cross-country skiing. Those results can be found above in this article in the cross-country skiing section. Some athletes (but not all) entered in both the cross-country skiing and Nordic combined event, their time on the 18 km was used for both events. One would expect that athletes competing at the Nordic combined event, would participate in the cross-country skiing event as well, as they would have the opportunity to win more than one medal. This was not always the case due to the maximum number of athletes (here: 4) could represent a country per event.

The ski jumping (normal hill) event was held separate from the main medal event of ski jumping, results can be found in the table below.

Ski jumping 

The event was unusual in that the bronze medalist was not determined for fifty years. Thorleif Haug of Norway was awarded third place at the event's conclusion, but a clerical error in calculating Haug's score was discovered in 1974 by Jacob Vaage, who further determined Anders Haugen of the United States, who had finished fourth, had actually scored 0.095 points more than Haug. The International Olympic Committee verified this, and in Oslo in September 1974, Haug's daughter presented the medal to the 86-year-old Haugen.

Speed skating

References

Olympic Winter Games 1924, full results by sports-reference.com

Nations at the 1924 Winter Olympics
1924
Olympics, Winter